Orgyen Wangchuk Tshering (born 14 September 1999) is a Bhutanese international footballer who plays as a midfielder for Bhutan National League side Thimphu City F.C.

International career
Tshering made his international debut in a 2–0 home loss to the Maldives in the third round of 2019 Asian Cup qualification.

Career statistics

International

References

External links
 

1999 births
Living people
Bhutanese footballers
Bhutan international footballers
Association football midfielders